Haloplanus salinarum is a halophilic Archaeon in the family of Halobacteriaceae. It was isolated from the Gomso solar saltern in Buan County, South Korea.

References

Euryarchaeota
Archaea described in 2017